The Cabinet of Kuwait is the chief executive body of the State of Kuwait. The 39th cabinet in the history of Kuwait was appointed on 28 December 2021. On 23 November 2021, Amir of Kuwait His Highness Sheikh Nawaf Al-Ahmad Al-Jaber Al-Sabah assigned His Highness Sheikh Sabah Al-Khaled Al-Hamad Al-Sabah as Prime Minister . The Amir has also assigned the Prime Minister to refer the cabinet line-up for their appointment. On 28 December 2021, the new cabinet line up was announced after the Amir approved in an Amiri order. On 17 February 2022, Amir of Kuwait accepted the resignations of the Minister of Defense & Minister of Interior. On 9 March 2022, an Amiri Decree has been issued appointing the interior minister and defense minister. On 22 March 2022, cabinet reshuffle took place, with the 3 existing minister being reassigned portfolios. On 5 April 2022, the Prime Minister tendered a letter of governmental resignation to the Crown Prince. On 10 May 2022, the Emir accepted the government resignation. The government will function as care-taker until the formation of the new government.

See also
Cabinet of Kuwait

References

External links
Current Ministerial Formation (Council of Ministers General Secretariat)
Official English names of Kuwaiti ministers and ministries (Kuwaiti Government)

Kuwait
Government of Kuwait
Cabinets established in 2021